Phoenix Airways was a short-lived South African  low cost airline in the mid-1990s.

History
The airline was formed by the merger of Letaba Airways and Giyani Airways in 1995, the same year was acquired by Cape Town-based Atlantic Air after running into financial difficulties.

Destinations
Phoenix Airways operated Johannesburg-Cape Town, Durban and Port Elizabeth-George routes 

Cape Town
Durban
George
Johannesburg
Port Elizabeth

Fleet
The airline operated a fleet of 4 Boeing 727s.

References

External links

Defunct airlines of South Africa